Saint-Pourçain-sur-Besbre (literally Saint-Pourçain on Besbre) is a commune in the Allier department in Auvergne-Rhône-Alpes in central France.

Le Pal is an animal theme park in the municipality area of Saint-Pourçain-sur-Besbre.

Population

See also
Communes of the Allier department

References

Communes of Allier
Allier communes articles needing translation from French Wikipedia